Irene Burillo Escorihuela  (born 23 July 1997) is a Spanish professional tennis player.

Burillo Escorihuela has career-high WTA rankings of 207 in singles, achieved January 2022, and 279 in doubles, set on 3 February 2020. She has won four singles titles and seven doubles titles on the ITF Circuit.

Career
In January 2021, Burillo Escorihuela won the inaugural Georgia's Rome Tennis Open, a $60k event, by defeating Grace Min in her fifth three-setter of the week to win her first title since 2017 – and her first above $15k level.

She made her WTA Tour debut at the 2022 Morocco Open.

Grand Slam singles performance timeline

ITF finals

Singles: 10 (4 titles, 6 runner–ups)

Doubles: 16 (7 titles, 9 runner–ups)

References

External links
 
 

1997 births
Living people
Spanish female tennis players
Sportspeople from Zaragoza